VISTAGY, Inc. is a business segment within the Siemens Digital Industries Software business unit and is located in Waltham, Massachusetts, USA. On December 6, 2011 Siemens closed its acquisition of VISTAGY. VISTAGY is a provider of engineering software and services focused on the specific requirements of vertical industries, including aerospace, automotive, marine, and wind energy. The company has sales and support offices throughout North and South America, Asia, and Europe. VISTAGY was founded by Steve Luby in 1991. He serves as the unit's president and CEO.

VISTAGY products are fully integrated into commercial 3D computer–aided–design platforms, including Siemens NX, Dassault Systèmes CATIA V4 and V5, and PTC Creo.

VISTAGY's software applications include:
 FiberSIM for designing and manufacturing composite structures
 SyncroFIT for designing and manufacturing airframe assemblies and large aerostructures
 Quality Planning Environment (QPE) for developing plans to assess aerostructure quality
 Seat Design Environment for designing and manufacturing transportation seat systems and interior components

The company supplies manufacturers in the aerospace, wind energy, automotive, and marine industries, including Bombardier Aerospace, General Motors, NASA, Nordex, Lotus Renault GP, and Howaldtswerke-Deutsche Werft (HDW).

References

Further reading
 "Siemens acquires materials software firm Vistagy for undisclosed terms” Boston Business Journal (November 9, 2011)
 "Vistagy acquisition closes” Reinforced Plastics (December 9, 2011)
  VISTAGY Series Page on the Siemens PLM Software Web site

External links
 
  "Coordinating CAD for Product Lifecycle" Aviation Week  (October 20, 2011)
 "Not just another road trip" Reinforced Plastics (October 11, 2011)
 "Vistagy Survey Benchmarks Composites Best-Practices" Design News (August 15, 2011)
 "The holistic approach" Aerospace Manufacturing (July 16, 2010)
 NASA Tech Briefs (November 1, 2009)
 "Formula 1 team accelerates design-to-track speed" High-Performance Composites (May 1, 2008)

Software companies based in Massachusetts
Software companies of the United States